Judas Priest are an English heavy metal band from Birmingham. Formed in September 1969, the group originally featured vocalist Al Atkins, guitarist John Perry (who died shortly after their formation and was replaced by Ernie Chataway), bassist Bruno Stapenhill and drummer John Partridge. The band broke up after just seven months, at which point Atkins joined a group called Freight which featured guitarist Kenneth "K. K." Downing, bassist Ian Hill and drummer John Ellis. Freight soon took over the Judas Priest moniker and underwent a succession of drummer changes: Alan Moore replaced Ellis in 1971, who was followed by Chris "Congo" Campbell, and later John Hinch in 1973. Hinch joined alongside his Hiroshima bandmate Rob Halford, after Atkins decided to leave due to the band's frustrations trying to sign a record deal.

Upon signing a deal with record label Gull in April 1974, Judas Priest enlisted Flying Hat Band frontman Glenn Tipton as a second guitarist. After the release and promotion of the band's debut album Rocka Rolla, Hinch was replaced by the returning Moore. The drummer performed on Sad Wings of Destiny, but left again during the sessions for its follow-up Sin After Sin, which were completed by session contributor Simon Phillips. For the album's promotional tour, Les Binks was brought in on drums. Binks remained for the albums Stained Class and Killing Machine, before he was replaced by former Trapeze drummer Dave Holland in August 1979. This lineup proved to be the most stable to date, producing six studio albums: British Steel, Point of Entry, Screaming for Vengeance, Defenders of the Faith, Turbo and Ram It Down.

In November 1989, Scott Travis replaced Holland and debuted on Painkiller. The album was the last at the time to feature Halford, who later left in May 1992. The group went on hiatus for a few years, before enlisting Tim "Ripper" Owens – frontman of a Judas Priest tribute act called British Steel – as Halford's replacement in May 1996. Owens recorded two albums with the band – 1997's Jugulator and 2001's Demolition – before Halford rejoined in July 2003. Angel of Retribution and Nostradamus followed, before Downing left and was replaced by Richie Faulkner in April 2011. The guitarist's departure was reportedly due to differences with other band members and management. In February 2018, Tipton ceased touring full-time with the band after being diagnosed with Parkinson's disease, with Andy Sneap taking his place.

Members

Current

Former

Touring

Session

Timeline

Lineups

References

Bibliography

External links
Judas Priest official website

Judas Priest